De Haven Glacier is a broad glacier flowing to the southwest corner of Porpoise Bay. It was delineated by G.D. Blodgett (1955) from aerial photographs taken by U.S. Navy Operation Highjump (1946–47), and was named by the Advisory Committee on Antarctic Names for Edwin De Haven, Acting Master on the sloop Vincennes during the United States Exploring Expedition (1838–42) under Lieutenant Charles Wilkes.

See also
 List of glaciers in the Antarctic
 Glaciology

References
 

Glaciers of Wilkes Land